Aluísio ("Lula") Elias Ferreira Xavier, commonly known as Lula Ferreira (born January 2, 1951 in São Paulo), is a Brazilian professional basketball coach.

Coaching career

Clubs
During his professional club head coaching career, Ferreira coached several clubs in Brazil's top-level league, the New Basket Brazil (NBB), including clubs like Universo BRB and Franca. As a head coach, he won the Brazilian Championship in 2003, and the São Paulo State Championship five times, in 2001, 2002, 2003, 2004, and 2005. He also won the FIBA Americas League championship in 2009. He was the Brazilian League Coach of the Year in 2010 and 2013.

National teams
As the head coach of the senior Brazilian national basketball team, Ferreira led Brazil to gold medals at the following tournaments: the 2003 FIBA South American Championship, the 2003 Pan American Games, the 2005 FIBA AmeriCup, the 2006 FIBA South American Championship, and the 2007 Pan American Games. He also won a silver medal at the 2004 FIBA South American Championship.

Ferreira was also the head coach of Brazil at the 2006 FIBA World Championship, in Japan. Brazil finished that tournament in 17th place.

References
CBB Profile 

1951 births
Living people
Brazilian basketball coaches
Franca Basquetebol Clube coaches
Basketball players from São Paulo